Cheff v. Schnackenberg, 384 U.S. 373 (1966), is a United States Supreme Court case in which the Court held that crimes carrying possible penalties up to six months imprisonment do not require a jury trial if they otherwise qualify as petty offenses.

References

External links

United States Sixth Amendment jury case law
United States Supreme Court cases
1966 in United States case law
United States Supreme Court cases of the Warren Court